Vermetidae incertae sedis goreensis is a species of sea snail, a marine gastropod mollusk in the family Vermetidae, the worm snails or worm shells.

This is a nomen dubium.

References

Vermetidae
Gastropods described in 1791
Protostome enigmatic taxa